Xtension is a Hong Kong based racehorse. He is one of the nominees of 2010-2011 Hong Kong Horse of the Year.

Major Win/s in the season of 2010-2011
BMW Champions Mile (G1)

References

 The Hong Kong Jockey Club – Xtension Racing Record
 The Hong Kong Jockey Club

Racehorses trained in Hong Kong
Hong Kong racehorses
Thoroughbred family 1-l